The 20th Emmy Awards, later known as the 20th Primetime Emmy Awards, were handed out on May 19, 1968.  The ceremony was hosted by Frank Sinatra and Dick Van Dyke.  Winners are listed in bold and series' networks are in parentheses.

The top shows of the night were, Get Smart and Mission: Impossible. Get Smart won three major awards, while the most nominated show was the anthology drama CBS Playhouse with nine, it also won three major awards.

The first posthumous Acting Emmy went to Marion Lorne for her performance in Bewitched, while The Avengers was the first non American produced nomination, having been syndicated from ABC Weekend TV, which was a part of the United Kingdom Independent Television Network, by ABC. However, other than sharing the same initials, the two companies were independent of each other.

Winners and nominees

Programs

Acting

Lead performances

Supporting performances

Single performances

Directing

Writing

Most major nominations
By network 
 CBS – 43
 NBC – 30
 ABC – 20

 By program
 CBS Playhouse (CBS) – 9
 Bewitched (ABC) / He & She (CBS) / Mission: Impossible (CBS) / Rowan & Martin's Laugh-In (NBC) – 5
 Get Smart (NBC) / Ironside (NBC) / The Lucy Show (CBS) – 4

Most major awards
By network 
 NBC – 10
 CBS – 9
 ABC – 3

 By program
 CBS Playhouse (CBS) / Get Smart (NBC) – 3
 Mission: Impossible (CBS) / Rowan & Martin's Laugh-In (NBC) – 2

Notes

References

External links
 Emmys.com list of 1968 Nominees & Winners
 

020
Primetime Emmy Awards
Primetime Emmy Awards
Primetime Emmy
Primetime Emmy Awards